Gymnosagena is a genus of tephritid  or fruit flies in the family Tephritidae.

Species
Gymnosagena campiglossina Freidberg & Merz, 2006
Gymnosagena kakamega Freidberg & Merz, 2006
Gymnosagena longicauda Freidberg & Merz, 2006
Gymnosagena nyikaensis Freidberg & Merz, 2006
Gymnosagena unicornuta Munro, 1935

References

Tephritinae
Tephritidae genera
Diptera of Africa